The South Africa women's national under-16 basketball team is a national basketball team of South Africa, administered by the Basketball South Africa.

It represents the country in international under-16 (under age 16) women's basketball competitions.

It appeared at the 2015 FIBA Africa Under-16 Championship for Women qualification round.

See also
South Africa women's national basketball team
South Africa women's national under-18 basketball team
South Africa men's national under-16 basketball team

References

External links
Archived records of South Africa team participations

Women's national under-16 basketball teams
basketball